Eurobodalla Shire is a local government area located in the South Coast region of New South Wales, Australia. The Shire is located in a largely mountainous coastal region and situated adjacent to the Tasman Sea, the Princes Highway and the Kings Highway.

The Mayor of Eurobodalla Shire Council is Cr. Mathew Hatcher, an unaligned politician. 

He is also the youngest mayor, in the modern-era, ever for the Eurobodalla. The Deputy Mayor, Cllr Alison Worthington, is the first female Deputy Mayor for the Eurobodalla.

Towns and localities
The shire chambers are located in the town of Moruya in the central part of the Shire. Other major towns within the shire include Batemans Bay and Narooma. Smaller towns, suburbs and hamlets include:

History
The area which is now Eurobodalla Shire was originally the home of the South Coast Bugelli-Manji and Yuin Aboriginal peoples.  The council signed a Commitment to Indigenous Australians and a Local Agreement with the Aboriginal Community.

The Eurobodalla Shire Council was formed in 1913 with the responsibility for administering local government functions along  of the NSW coast between Durras and Wallaga Lake. The council administers only about 30% of the area of the Shire as the remaining 70% is non-rateable crown land held as national park and state forest: 40% of the shire is national park, 30% is state forest, 20% is productive farmland and 10% is urban settlement.

The Shire is unusual in that nearly half of ratepayers are non-residents. Just over 17% of ratepayers are residents of Canberra.  Although the permanent population is around 34,100, the visiting population (who stay more than 3 nights) is 3.1 million per year.

Heritage listings
The Eurobodalla Shire has a number of heritage-listed sites, including:
 Bergalia, Lakeview Homestead Complex
 Montague Island, Montague Island Light
 Moruya, Moruya and District Historical Society 85 Campbell Street: Abernethy and Co Stonemason's Lathe
 Moruya, 13 Page Street: Moruya Mechanics' Institute

Economy
The main growth industries in the area are construction, government services, real estate, retail, retirement, aged care, tourism, while dairy farming, forestry, sawmilling and commercial fishing are traditional industries in decline. Eurobodalla Shire is serviced by two highways – the Princes Highway between Sydney and Melbourne (part of Highway One around Australia), and the Kings Highway (National Route 52) linking Batemans Bay to Canberra. Moruya Airport, just east of the township of Moruya, is serviced by regular scheduled commuter flights to Sydney and Melbourne. There are no railways or major seaports in Eurobodalla Shire.

Census 2021 statistics

Demographics

The area of 3,428 square kilometre gives a population density 11.8 people per square kilometre.

Age distribution
Median age: 54, compared to the national median on 38.
Children aged under 15 years: 13.9%.
People aged 65 years and over: 32.9%.

Nation of birth
 Australia – 77.9%, compared to the national average of 66.9% 
 England – 4.8%
 New Zealand – 1.3%
 Germany – 0.7%
 Scotland – 0.6%
 Netherlands – 0.5%
 Aboriginal or Torres Strait Islanders: 6.1%

Languages spoken at home
 English only – 88.5%
 German – 0.3%
 Italian – 0.3%
 Croatian – 0.2%
 Spanish – 0.2%
 Greek – 0.2%

Religion
 No Religion – 41.9%
 Catholic – 18.9%
 Anglican – 17.3%
 Uniting Church – 2.5%

Housing
Median weekly rent: $325
Median monthly home loan repayments: $1,517
Median weekly individual income: $618
Median weekly household income: $1,167

Household motor vehicle ownership
No vehicle – 4.3%
One vehicle – 38.3%
Two vehicles – 37.7%
Three or more vehicles – 17.9%

Housing tenure
 Owned outright – 49.3% 
 Owned with a mortgage – 23.8% 
 Rented – 22.5%

Structure of inhabited dwellings
 Separate houses – 83.6% 
 Semi-detached, row or terrace houses, townhouses etc. – 8.3% 
 Flats, units or apartments – 5.9% 
 Other dwellings –  1.9%

Employment
 Worked full-time – 47.6%
 Worked part-time – 40.4%
 Away from work – 7.9%
 Unemployed – 4.1%

Council

Current composition and election method
Eurobodalla Shire Council is composed of nine councillors, including the mayor, for a fixed four-year term of office. The mayor is directly elected while the eight other councillors are elected proportionally as one entire ward. The most recent election was held on 25 October 2021, and the makeup of the council, including the mayor, is as follows:

The current Council, elected in 2021, in order of election, is:

References

External links
 Eurobodalla population planning link
 District history
 Eurobodalla Ratepayers Association

 
Local government areas of the South Coast (New South Wales)